Orphée is the tenth full-length studio album by Icelandic composer Jóhann Jóhannsson, released under Deutsche Grammophon on September 16, 2016. The music is inspired by Jean Cocteau's film of the same name and by Ovid's interpretation of the Orpheus myth.

Track listing

Year-end charts

References

External links
 

2016 classical albums
Deutsche Grammophon albums
Jóhann Jóhannsson albums
Music based on Metamorphoses
Adaptations of works by Jean Cocteau